Orthochilus is a genus of orchids that consists of at least 34 species, most of which are native to Africa and Madagascar with a few species in tropical and subtropical America. The genus was first formally described in 1850 by the French botanist Achille Richard, who cited an earlier suggestion by the German botanist Christian Ferdinand Friedrich Hochstetter. Richard recognized a single species, Orthochilus abyssinicus, and noted that the genus shared many features with the closely related genus Eulophia, but differed from it in the form of the pollen masses and caudicule, a stalk to which the pollen masses are attached. The genus Orthochilus has often been viewed as a synonym of the larger genus Eulophia by many botanists, but a recent molecular phylogeny published in 2014 revealed that Eulophia, as traditionally circumscribed, was paraphyletic unless Orthochilus was recognized as a separate genus.

As circumscribed by Martos et al., the genus Orthochilus includes many species formerly recognized as belonging to the large genus Eulophia and the smaller genus Pteroglossaspis. The species in Orthochilus can be readily identified as different from Eulophia in that their petals and sepals are similar in appearance (shape, size, and color) and the flowers are roughly bell-shaped (campanulate), whereas most Eulophia have sepals and petals that differ in appearance. Further study of other species currently assigned to Eulophia may increase the total number of species recognized within the Orthochilus clade.

Species

Orthochilus abyssinicus (Rchb.f.) Hochst. ex A.Rich.
Orthochilus aculeatus (L.f.) Bytebier
Orthochilus aculeatus subsp. huttonii (Rolfe) Bytebier
Orthochilus adenoglossus (Lindl.) Bytebier
Orthochilus albobrunneus (Kraenzl.) Bytebier
Orthochilus aurantiacus (Rolfe) Bytebier
Orthochilus carsonii (Rolfe) Bytebier
Orthochilus chloranthus (Schltr.) Bytebier
Orthochilus clandestinus (Börge Pett.) Bytebier
Orthochilus corymbosus (G.Will.) Bytebier
Orthochilus distans (Summerh.) Bytebier
Orthochilus ecristatus (Fernald) Bytebier
Orthochilus ensatus (Lindl.) Bytebier
Orthochilus euanthus (Schltr.) Bytebier
Orthochilus eustachyus (Rchb.f.) Bytebier
Orthochilus foliosus (Lindl.) Bytebier
Orthochilus holubii (Rolfe) Bytebier
Orthochilus leontoglossus (Rchb.f.) Bytebier
Orthochilus litoralis (Schltr.) Bytebier
Orthochilus mechowii Rchb.f
Orthochilus milnei (Rchb.f.) Bytebier
Orthochilus montis-elgonis (Summerh.) Bytebier
Orthochilus nuttii (Rolfe) Bytebier
Orthochilus odontoglossus (Rchb.f.) Bytebier
Orthochilus pottsii (P.M.Br. & DeAngelis) Bytebier
Orthochilus rarus (Schltr.) Bytebier
Orthochilus rutenbergianus (Kraenzl.) Bytebier
Orthochilus ruwenzoriensis (Rendle) Bytebier
Orthochilus subulatus (Rendle) Bytebier
Orthochilus tabularis (L.f.) Bytebier
Orthochilus thomsonii (Rolfe) Bytebier
Orthochilus trilamellatus (De Wild.) Bytebier
Orthochilus vinosus (McMurtry & G.McDonald) Bytebier
Orthochilus walleri (Rchb.f.) Bytebier
Orthochilus welwitschii Rchb.f.

References

Eulophiinae
Cymbidieae genera